William Granville Cochran (November 13, 1844 – February 7, 1932) was an American lawyer and politician.

Cochran was born in Ross County, Ohio. He moved with his parents to Moultrie County, Illinois, in 1849, and eventually settled in Sullivan, Illinois. Cochran served in the 126th Illinois Infantry Regiment during the American Civil War. He studied law and was admitted to the Illinois bar in 1879. He served as Illinois Circuit Court judge. Cochran served in the Illinois House of Representatives from 1889 to 1891 and from 1895 to 1899. He was involved with the Republican Party. He also served as speaker of the house. Cochran died at his daughter's home in Sullivan, Illinois.

Notes

External links

1844 births
1932 deaths
People from Ross County, Ohio
People from Sullivan, Illinois
People of Illinois in the American Civil War
Illinois lawyers
Illinois state court judges
Speakers of the Illinois House of Representatives
Republican Party members of the Illinois House of Representatives